Ashley Sampi (born 21 January 1984) is an indigenous Australian rules footballer who played for the West Coast Eagles in the Australian Football League. He attended Trinity College in Perth, Western Australia and is most well known for taking the 2004 AFL Mark of the Year.

AFL career
Recruited by the Eagles at number six in the rich 2001 AFL National Draft, Sampi debuted against Geelong in round 14 of the 2002 season. In his debut season, Sampi played four games, including a final.  Playing as a small forward, Sampi's AFL career was inconsistent; despite being a regular part of the side though the 2003 to 2005 seasons, he did not reach the heights that were expected of him given his original high selection.

The high point of Sampi's career was his AFL Mark of the Year in 2004 against . Sampi was also selected in the Eagles' 2005 losing Grand Final team, but took a major step backward in the 2006 season, losing his regular spot in the team, and only managing twelve games though poor form, and not playing in the Eagle's victorious 2006 AFL Grand Final team.

Sampi's form seems to have often been related to weight issues. During the 2007 pre-season, Sampi was at times required to train separately from the rest of the club to deal with his weight issues; however, they seemed to come back under control, and he was reinstated to the main training list. Despite this, he failed to be selected for a single game throughout 2007, and he was delisted at the end of the season. He played for Port Fairy in 2008.

Controversy
During 2006, Sampi allegedly threatened his girlfriend and her sister with a knife.

In 2007, Sampi was involved in a paternity dispute with his ex-girlfriend Christina Taylor. She claims that her daughter was the result of a planned pregnancy with Sampi. However, Sampi refused to sign the birth certificate or visit the child until it is proven that she is his daughter.

References

External links

WAFL statistics

1984 births
Living people
Indigenous Australian players of Australian rules football
Indigenous Australians from Western Australia
West Coast Eagles players
South Fremantle Football Club players
Port Fairy Football Club players
People educated at Trinity College, Perth
People from the Kimberley (Western Australia)
Australian rules footballers from Perth, Western Australia